Selleys is an Australian company which produces household do it yourself and cleaning products, as well as a wide range of adhesives and sealants for both the DIY and trade market.

History 
Martin Selley established the Selleys Chemical Company after he left Germany for Australia in 1939, and sold wood putty.

Selleys is now a subsidiary of Dulux.

Products
Products produced by Selleys include:
 Alu-Mesh
 Ezy-Glide
 Flash-Wax
 No More Gaps
 Brown
 Spakfilla
 Sugar Soap

References

External links
 

Australian companies established in 1939
Manufacturing companies of Australia
Imperial Chemical Industries
Australian subsidiaries of foreign companies
Brand name materials
Petroleum based lubricants
Trade secrets
Products introduced in 1939
Chemical companies of Australia